Michał Żebrakowski (born 7 January 1997) is a Polish professional footballer who plays as a forward for Motor Lublin.

Senior career

Żebrakowski started his career with the team in the town of his birth, Stal in Rzeszów. After coming up through their youth system, he made his debut for Stal in 2014. After his first professional season he joined Lechia Gdańsk in the summer of 2015. His time at Lechia was unsuccessful, and he only managed 3 appearances for the first team. At the end of the season he made the move to Siarka Tarnobrzeg. Żebrakowski's time with Siarka was more successful, and he played most of the games that season, scoring 9 goals for the club. The next season, Żebrakowski found himself playing in the top division once again, this time for Lechia's main rivals, Arka Gdynia. In his first competitive appearance for Arka he helped the team to win the Polish SuperCup for the first time in their history. Żebrakowski failed to make a claim for a starting place in the Arka first team, and moved on loan to Górnik Łęczna for six months. This move also turned out to be unsuccessful, and he managed only one game for Górnik during the loan spell.

Honours
Arka Gdynia
Polish Super Cup: 2017

References

External links

1997 births
Living people
Poland youth international footballers
Stal Rzeszów players
Lechia Gdańsk players
Siarka Tarnobrzeg players
Arka Gdynia players
Górnik Łęczna players
Warta Poznań players
Wigry Suwałki players
Motor Lublin players
Ekstraklasa players
I liga players
II liga players
Polish footballers
Association football forwards